Norbert Kox (August 6, 1945 – December 29. 2018) was an American outsider artist whose paintings display an unusual approach to religious iconography.

Life
Norbert Kox was born in Green Bay, Wisconsin in 1945.  While a member of the Outlaws biker gang, Kox began working on custom bikes and cars, soon progressing to painting on other items, creating artworks from rubbish or salvaged objects. Leaving the biker gang was an emotional struggle, which Kox only achieved through immersing himself in religion. Kox soon found that he disbelieved the conventional teachings of Christianity, preferring his own interpretations. He joined the United States Army and, with the help of art instruction books, began painting. Between 1975 and 1985, Kox went through a period of religious isolation, living as a hermit in the wilderness of his personal outdoor chapel known as "Gospel Road". On his return to Green Bay, he continued to work on his apocalyptic, spiritual paintings.

Work
Kox's pictures are religious visions of the battle between good and evil, detailing spiritual scripts and examining the worship of various false icons. He organised his compositions with pencil then employed a complex layering technique, depositing layers of vivid oils and watercolors. The final glazing of his paintings, combined with the strongly contrasted hues he used, endowed each of these works with brilliant and translucent qualities.

Bibliography
 Raw Vision No. 14, 1996. 
 Raw Vision No. 65, 2008.
 Religious Visionaries, John Michael Kohler Arts Center, 1991.  
 The End is Near!: Visions of Apocalypse, Millennium and Utopia.  American Visionary Art Museum, 1998.

References

External links

1945 births
2018 deaths
Outsider artists
Writers from Green Bay, Wisconsin
Artists from Wisconsin
Military personnel from Wisconsin